Priya Punia (born 6 August 1996) is an Indian cricketer. In December 2018, she was named in India's squad for their series against New Zealand. She made her Women's Twenty20 International cricket (WT20I) debut for India against New Zealand Women on 6 February 2019.

In September 2019, she was named in India's Women's One Day International (WODI) squad for their series against South Africa. She made her WODI debut for India, against South Africa, on 9 October 2019.

In May 2021, she was named in India's Test squad for their one-off match against the England women's cricket team.

References

External links
 

1996 births
Living people
People from Jaipur
Indian women cricketers
India women One Day International cricketers
India women Twenty20 International cricketers
Delhi women cricketers
North Zone women cricketers
IPL Supernovas cricketers